Paradrillia inconstans is a species of sea snail, a marine gastropod mollusk in the family Horaiclavidae, the turrids.

Subspecies
 Paradrillia inconstans prunulum (Melvill, J.C. & R. Standen, 1901) (synonyms: Drillia prunulum Melvill, J.C. & R. Standen, 1901; Paradrillia gaylordae Preston, 1905)

Description
The length of the shell attains 15 mm.

Distribution
This marine species occurs off Japan and Queensland, Australia

References

 Smith, E.A. 1875. A list of the Gasteropoda collected in Japanese seas by Commander H.C. St. John, R.N. Annals and Magazine of Natural History 4 15: 414–427
 Preston, H.B. 1905. Descriptions of new species of marine shells from Ceylon. Journal of Malacology 12(1): 1–8
 Habe, T. 1961. Coloured illustrations of shells of Japan. Osaka, Japan : Hoikusha 82 pp., 66 pls.
 Wilson, B. 1994. Australian Marine Shells. Prosobranch Gastropods. Kallaroo, WA : Odyssey Publishing Vol. 2 370 pp.

External links
 
  Tucker, J.K. 2004 Catalog of recent and fossil turrids (Mollusca: Gastropoda). Zootaxa 682:1–1295.

inconstans
Gastropods described in 1875